John Thomason (1893–1944) was a U.S. Army officer and author.

John Thomason may also refer to:
 John W. Thomason (politician) (1874–1953), American politician
 USS John W. Thomason (DD-760)

Thomason, John